Headliner may refer to:
 Headliner (material), the overhead layer of material closest to the passenger of a vehicle.
 Headliner (performances), a main act, following an opening act, or the leading attraction in any piece of entertainment
 Paramount Headliner, 1930s musical shorts or "one-reelers" by Paramount Pictures featuring performers who were headliners
 Headliner (TV programme), a Hong Kong political satire programme, produced by Radio Television Hong Kong
 Headliner (DJ) (born 1967), musician
 Headliners (charity), organization
 Headliners is a BBC Radio 5 Live series of interviews hosted by Nihal Arthanayake